Soft Space is the second album by keyboardist Jeff Lorber as leader of his band The Jeff Lorber Fusion. Released in 1978, this album featured special guest artists,  Chick Corea and Joe Farrell. This was the group's last effort for Inner City Records before moving on to Arista Records the following year.

Track listing

Personnel 
The Jeff Lorber Fusion
 Jeff Lorber – acoustic piano, Fender Rhodes, Moog synthesizer, Oberheim 4 Voice
 Lester McFarland – electric bass
 Dennis Bradford – drums
 Terry Layne – flute, alto saxophone, tenor saxophone

Special guests
 Chick Corea – Minimoog solo (1), Minimoog (5)
 Joe Farrell – soprano saxophone (2), flute (3)

Additional musicians
 Dean Reichert – acoustic guitar, electric guitars
 Bruce Smith – congas, percussion
 Ron Young – congas, percussion

Production 
 Jeff Lorber – producer 
 Marlon McClain – producer
 Dave Dixon – engineer 
 Reggie Dozier – engineer
 Gilbert Kong – mastering 
 Mathew Cohen – cover design, artwork 
 Leo Bliok – liner design
 Ancil Nance – photography

Studios
 Recorded at ABC Recording Studios (Hollywood, California) and Ripcord Studios (Vancouver, Washington).
 Mastered at Masterdisk (New York City, New York).

Charts

References

External links
 Jeff Lorber-Soft Space at Discogs

1978 albums
Jeff Lorber albums
Inner City Records albums